Olga Viktorovna Shcherbak (born 14 March 1998) is a Russian handball player who plays for HC Lada.

Achievements
Russian Super League:
Silver Medalist: 2017, 2018

References
 

1998 births
Living people
Sportspeople from Sevastopol
Russian female handball players